Siobhán Kate Cullen (born February 1990) is an Irish actress. She began her career as a child actress, making her debut in Marina Carr's By the Bog of Cats (1998) at the Abbey Theatre. She landed her first major screen role in Eoin Macken's horror film The Inside (2012).

Cullen is known for her roles in the RTÉ1 and BBC One miniseries Paula (2017), the web series Origin (2018), the ITV adaptation of The Long Call (2021), and the BritBox series The Dry (2022). She was named a 2022 Screen International Star of Tomorrow.

Early life
Cullen grew up in Rathfarnham, a Southside suburb of Dublin. She attended Loreto High School Beaufort and took classes at Ann Kavanagh's Young People's Theatre. She graduated with a Bachelor of Arts in Drama and Theatre Studies from Trinity College Dublin.

Career
Cullen was about eight when she was cast in her first professional play as Josie Kilbride in Marina Carr's By the Bog of Cats at the Abbey Theatre. This was followed in 2001 by her feature film debut in The Crooked Mile and another Abbey Theatre role in Ariel, and in 2003, she played young Jane Eyre at the Gate Theatre. She made her television debut as Kristen in the fifth season of the RTÉ One medical drama The Clinic, which aired in 2007.

Cullen would return to the Gate Theatre in the 2011 production of A Woman of No Importance, the 2012 production of An Enemy of the People, and the 2014 production of An Ideal Husband. Also in 2012, she starred in Eoin Macken's horror film The Inside and made her New York stage debut in The Life and Sort of Death of Eric Argyle at 59E59 Theater. She appeared in the 2013 biopic Jimi: All Is by My Side.

In 2016, Cullen appeared in the films The Randomer and The Limehouse Golem, and made her London stage debut with a small role in The Plough and the Stars at the National Theatre in 2016. She returned to television the following year as Morgan in the RTÉ1 and BBC One miniseries Paula.

For her lead performance in The Cherry Orchard in Galway, Cullen was nominated for an Irish Theatre Award. She starred opposite Gemma-Leah Devereux in the film The Bright Side, had a main role in the ITV crime drama The Long Call as Caroline Reasley, and made a guest appearance in an episode of Dalgliesh on Channel 5.

In 2022, Cullen starred as Caroline Sheridan in the RTÉ One and BritBox comedy-drama The Dry. She originated the role of Finnuala Connell in the  Straight Line Crazy at London's Bridge Theatre and appeared in Good Sex at the Dublin Theatre Festival. Cullen has upcoming roles in the Netflix series Bodkin (or On Record) and the Hulu series Obituary.

Filmography

Film

Television

Web

Stage

Awards and nominations

References

External links
 

Living people
1990 births
21st-century Irish actresses
Actresses from County Dublin
Alumni of Trinity College Dublin
Irish child actresses
Irish stage actresses
People from Rathfarnham